Karamucho is a Japanese snack food, which consists of potato sticks or potato chips, and is spicy by Japanese standards. Each 57g packet contains 301 calories.

The name is a play on the Japanese word Karai (辛い, spicy); and the Spanish word "Mucho", meaning "a lot" and has been present on the market since 1984.

References

External links
Koikeya official site features an animated version of Bokun's quest for revenge
kara-mucho.com alternative official site features more information such as recipes

Japanese snack food